Gruzovik Press, a Russian automotive publication, is a monthly publication on trucks, buses and military vehicles. Of Russian publications on this topic, it is aimed at not only professionals but also for ordinary fans of this technology, where particularly unique materials are published on the history of the samples of this technique, written by experts in the field, materials for car models and is also commercially available.

It is the only magazine in Russia on this subject which conducts a full-scale coverage of test tool technology on various vehicle technologies.

"Gruzovik Press" regularly participates in thematic exhibitions.

The magazine has been published since 2003. In 2014, it launched the electronic version of the magazine for IPad.

References

External links
Official site
Website publisher

2003 establishments in Russia
Magazines established in 2003
Automobile magazines published in Russia
Russian-language magazines
Monthly magazines published in Russia